Sanjay Suri (born 6 April 1971) is an Indian actor and film producer of Hindi cinema. He made his debut in the film Pyaar Mein Kabhi Kabhi (1999). He went on to star in many supporting roles, but finally got his big break with Jhankaar Beats in 2003, when he got recognised by the audience as a seasoned actor. He is also the co-producer and actor in the film I Am. He is also the co-founder of the film production company Anticlock Films.

Personal life
Sanjay Suri was born on 6 April 1971 to a family of Punjabi origin in Srinagar, Kashmir, where he spent 19 years of his life. He has an elder brother and an elder sister. Living in Srinagar, where he attended Burn Hall School, he developed a strong love for nature and the outdoors. As a child, Suri was a star squash player and was on his school and state teams. In 1990, his father was killed in a terrorist attack, and the family was forced to flee to Jammu, where they briefly lived in a refugee camp. They then shifted to Delhi.

Suri and his wife, Ambika, have two children.

Career

Modelling
When Suri moved to New Delhi in 1990, he was thrust into the world of modelling. He modelled for many companies including Gillette, Nilkamal Furniture, Times of India, Philishave, and Nescafe.

Acting
1999 witnessed Suri's breakthrough in Bollywood with a supporting role in the movie Pyaar Mein Kabhi Kabhi, co-starring with Rinke Khanna and Dino Morea. Although the movie flopped, Suri was noticed. His next films were Daman: A Victim of Marital Violence (2001), Filhaal... and the musical Dil Vil Pyar Vyar (2002).

With 2003's Pinjar co-starring Urmila Matondkar he got rave reviews, but it was not until Jhankaar Beats later that year that he became popular. His role alongside Juhi Chawla was greatly appreciated. Slowly, he got more roles in movies, but his movies were not box office successes. Despite the failure of his films, his performances continued to get appreciation.

In 2005, he delivered a critically acclaimed performance in My Brother... Nikhil, as a homosexual who happens to be HIV positive, once again co-starring Juhi Chawla. The movie received unanimous praise among Indian film critics. The movie fared decently in Mumbai, but was a failure elsewhere in India.

Production
Suri and Onir (who also directed My Brother Nikhil) also worked on Sorry Bhai! and under the banner of Anticlock Films have produced I Am, which weaves together four stories on different topical issues. With this film, they have ventured into a new mode of production involving crowdsourcing, a concept that had not been explored before in Indian cinema. The movie released on 29 April 2011 and went on to win the National Film Award for Best Feature Film in Hindi.

Filmography

Films

Web series

Accolades
Sanjay Suri has been honoured by Sandeep Marwah with membership of the International Film and Television Club of Asian Academy of Film & Television. I Am, co-produced and directed by Sanjay Suri, was awarded the David Flint honorary award for promoting human rights. The film also won the best in Asian Cinema award (NETPAC) at the international Kerala film festival 2010 and went on to win the audience choice award, best film at the Florence "River to River" festival 2010. Suri was a part of the Incredible India team that represented 'I AM' at the Cannes Film Festival 2012.

References

External links

 
 
 

Male actors from Jammu and Kashmir
Indian male models
1971 births
Living people
Kashmiri people
People from Srinagar
Male actors in Hindi cinema
20th-century Indian male actors
21st-century Indian male actors
Punjabi Hindus